Michael Cosgrove (born 1954) is an Irish former hurler who played as a corner-forward for the Westmeath senior team.

Born in Collinstown, County Westmeath, Cosgrove first arrived on the inter-county scene when he first linked up with the Westmeath minor team, before later joining the under-21 side. He joined the senior panel for the 1974 championship. Cosgrove went on to play a key role for Westmeath for over a decade, and won two All-Ireland "B" Championship medals.

As a member of the Leinster inter-provincial team on one occasion, Cosgrove enjoyed little success in the Railway Cup. At club level he is a two-time championship medallist with Lough Lene Gaels. Cosgrove also won three New York senior championship medals with the Westmeath club.

Cosgrove's retirement came when he emigrated to the United States in 1987, however, he made one final appearance for Westmeath in 1993.

In retirement from playing Cosgrove became involved in team management and coaching. As physical trainer and manager, he guided Lough Lene Gaels to five championship titles. Cosgrove later served as a selector and manager to the Westmeath senior hurling team.

His son, Killian, also played hurling with Westmeath.

Honours

Player

Lough Lene Gaels
Westmeath Senior Hurling Championship (2): 1975, 1976

Westmeath Club
New York Senior Hurling Championship (3): 1990, 1992, 1993

Westmeath
All-Ireland Senior B Hurling Championship (2): 1975, 1984
Walsh Cup (1): 1982

Coach

Lough Lene Gaels
Westmeath Senior Hurling Championship (5): 1996, 1998, 1999, 2000, 2002

References

 

1954 births
Living people
Lough Lene Gaels hurlers
Westmeath inter-county hurlers
Leinster inter-provincial hurlers
Hurling managers
Hurling selectors